The Wandsworth and District Gas Company was a maker and distributor of coal gas in southwest London from 1834 until 1949.

History
The Wandsworth gasworks was built in 1834 on the Surrey bank of the River Thames near Wandsworth Bridge. Its supplied Wandsworth, Putney and part of Battersea. The undertaking became the Wandsworth and Putney Gaslight and Coke Company in 1854 and was incorporated by Act of Parliament in 1856.

In 1912 the company merged with the Mitcham and Wimbledon District Gaslight Company and the Epsom and Ewell Gas Company to form the Wandsworth, Wimbledon and Epsom District Gas Company. In 1924 it bought land at Worcester Park to build more gas holders.

In 1931 the company took over the Kingston upon Thames Gas Company and the Sutton Gas Company and retitled itself the Wandsworth and District Gas Company. In 1936 it took over the Leatherhead Gas and Lighting Company and the Walton upon Thames and Weybridge Gas Company.

In 1949 the Wandsworth and District Gas Company was nationalised under the Gas Act 1948 and became part of the West Surrey Division of the South Eastern Gas Board.

Colliers

Coal was brought by coastal colliers from North East England and unloaded by cranes on pontoons on the Thames beside the gasworks. The colliers were flatirons in order to fit under the Thames bridges upriver from the Pool of London to Wandsworth.

The company's ships had brown upper works above hull level. The funnel was black with a broad white band edged with a narrow red band above and below, and the broad white band was emblazoned with the initials "W&D GAS Co". The house flag was red with the initials "W.G.C." in white capitals.

Fleet
In 1906 the company bought its own flatiron, Radcliffe, which had capacity for about 1,050 long tons of coal.

In 1909 W. Dobson & Co of Newcastle-upon-Tyne built an 889 GRT flatiron collier for the gas company. She was named Wandle, the first of three colliers in the company's service to carry that name. As UB-27 was on the surface Wandle engaged her. At the time it was believed Wandle had sunk the submarine and the Master, G.E.A. Mastin, and his crew were celebrated in Britain. However, UB-27 survived the engagement and was not lost until July 1917.

In 1916 John Crown & Sons Ltd of Sunderland built the 1,873 GRT flatiron Lightfoot for the gas company. In 1918 she was sold to the Witherington and Everett Steam Ship Company of Newcastle-upon-Tyne. On 16 March 1918 Lightfoot was in the English Channel en route from London to Barry when the German submarine  torpedoed and sank her two miles south of the Owers Lightship off Selsey Bill.

In 1922 the Burntisland Shipbuilding Company of Fife, Scotland launched a 932 GRT flatiron for the gas company. She was named Wandle to replace the 1909 vessel. In 1932 she was sold to Stephenson Clarke & Associated Companies who renamed her Pitwines.

In 1923 Burntisland launched three barges for the gas company: the  Southfield in February, Springfield in March and the  Beverley in May.

In 1924 Burntisland launched the 1,527 GRT flatiron Woodcote for the gas company. In 1934 she was sold to Stephenson Clarke, who renamed her Cerne.

In 1926 Burntisland launched the 1,350 GRT flatiron Ewell in May and completed her in July. In 1949 she passed to the SEGB fleet and in 1958 she was sold to new owners in Ravenna, Italy who converted her into a grain lighter and renamed her Candiano.

In 1930 Burntisland launched the 1,351 GRT flatiron Tolworth for the gas company. In 1949 she passed to the SEGB fleet and in 1958 she was sold to new owners in Ravenna, Italy who converted her into a harbour pontoon and renamed her S Apolinare.

In 1931 Burntisland launched the 327 GRT barge Kingston for the gas company.

In 1932 Burntisland launched a 1,482 GRT flatiron for the gas company. She became the third , after her predecessor who was sold to Stephenson Clarke that same year. On 9 November 1942 an E-boat torpedoed her in the North Sea off Lowestoft, almost completely blowing off her bow. One of her gunners was killed but she remained afloat and the next day was towed to Yarmouth and beached. She was then towed into South Shields and dry-docked, a new bow was built onto her and on 8 April 1943 she was ready to return to service. In 1949 she passed to the SEGB fleet and in 1959 she was towed to Rotterdam and scrapped.

In 1937 Burntisland launched the 1,597 GRT flatiron Wimbledon for the gas company. In 1949 she passed to the SEGB fleet. One crew member was killed.

In January 1946 Burntisland launched the 1,720 GRT flatiron Chessington for the gas company. In 1949 she passed to the SEGB fleet and in 1966 she was sold to new owners in Gothenburg, Sweden who converted her into a storage hulk.

In April 1946 Burntisland launched a motor ship, the 1,787 GRT flatiron Mitcham, for the gas company. In 1949 she passed to the SEGB fleet and in 1969 she was sold to new owners in the Cayman Islands who renamed her Tortugas.

References

Sources

Chemical industry in London
Defunct shipping companies of the United Kingdom
History of the London Borough of Wandsworth
Industrial history of London
Oil and gas companies of the United Kingdom